Bifrontal craniotomy is a surgical process which is used to target different tumors or malfunctioning areas of the brain.

References

Neurosurgical procedures